Salvatore Santoro may refer to:
 Salvatore Santoro (mobster)
 Salvatore Santoro (footballer)